Cyril Stennart Pepper (18 November 1911 – 31 May 1943) was a New Zealand rugby union player. A prop, Pepper represented  at a provincial level, and was a member of the New Zealand national side, the All Blacks, from 1935 to 1936. He was part of the squad for the 1935–36 New Zealand rugby union tour of Britain, Ireland and Canada, but never managed a full test cap. He died aged 31 after succumbing to injuries received in WW2 service.

References 

1911 births
1943 deaths
Rugby union players from Auckland
New Zealand rugby union players
Auckland rugby union players
Rugby union props
New Zealand military personnel killed in World War II
New Zealand military personnel of World War II